Red Hill is an album by trumpeter Wadada Leo Smith, keyboardist Jamie Saft, bassist Joe Morris and drummer Balázs Pándi  which was released on the RareNoise label in 2014.

Reception

In his review for Allmusic, Thom Jurek notes that "What is at work on Red Hill is the voice of a creative and surprisingly unified anarchy. There is plenty of firepower, but this is no skronk session ... the music is allowed to develop and unfold unhurriedly. There are no duels, or teams engaging in competitive musical athletics. These four highly individual voices all contribute to a vast conversation that contains many multiple utterances inside what is revealed as a bracing, new, but common language. Red Hill is avant-garde jazz at its best; on the spot, its players continually reinvent themselves and the music". On All About Jazz, John Sharpe said "Together they create six intense and densely voiced collective improvisations. Ambient mood and texture is as important as rhythm or counterpoint. Pandi in particular forces the pace with his non-stop barrage, as bass and drums form a clattering wall of sound. Saft's keyboards variously match or oppose and at times he resorts to a series of glissandos to cut through. Smith meanwhile is imperious, interacting with the others predominantly by taking an opposing stance The default position is manifest in the tension generated by the contrast between Smith's poised trumpet fanfares and the choppy continuous backing". On PopMatters, Will Layman observed "Red Hill sets its sights for the horizon. The rhythm section of Saft, Morris, and Pandi is extremely inventive, providing washes of color and texture that move beneath Smith like an undulating sea.".

Track listing
All compositions by Wadada Leo Smith, Jamie Saft, Joe Morris and Balázs Pándi
 "Gneiss" - 12:23
 "Janus Face" - 14:36
 "Agpaitic" - 7:53
 "Tragic Wisdom" - 12:46
 "Debts of Honor" - 9:37
 "Arfvedsonite" - 9:17

Personnel
Wadada Leo Smith - trumpet
Jamie Saft - piano, electric piano
Joe Morris - bass 
Balázs Pándi - drums

References

Jamie Saft albums
Wadada Leo Smith albums
Joe Morris (guitarist) albums
2014 albums
RareNoiseRecords albums